For the performer of the 1992 dance hit "Don't You Want Me" see Felix (musician)

Felix were a British chamber pop musical group, whose members included Lucinda Chua, Chris Summerlin and Elv Beetham. In 2009, Felix signed to Chicago-based label Kranky,  following support from Ambient Music band Stars of the Lid. Their debut album met positive feedback from BBC Music and Pitchfork.

Chua has played with A Winged Victory for the Sullen and, in 2017, was working on a solo album produced by Adam Wiltzie from the band.

Discography
"What I Learned from TV" (2007) - Split 7" with Chris Herbert
"You Are the One I Pick" (2009)
"Oh Holy Molar" (2012)

References

External links
Felix at Kranky
Felix at Domino Recording Company
Felix at Discogs

Chamber pop musicians
Musical groups from Nottingham